Lake Jessie may refer to the following places in the United States:

 Lake Jessie (Winter Haven, Florida)
 Lake Jessie (North Dakota)
 Lake Jessie Township, Itasca County, Minnesota

See also
 Jessie Lake, Alberta, Canada